Grand Ayatollah Shams al-din al-Waizi  (Arabic:  شمس الدين الواعظي) (born 1936) is an Iraqi Twelver Shi'a Marja'.

He has studied in seminaries of Najaf, Iraq under Grand Ayatollah Abul-Qassim Khoei and Muhsin al-Hakim.

See also
List of Maraji

Notes

External links
سماحة الشيخ شمس الدين الواعظي
Personal Resaleh

Iraqi grand ayatollahs
1936 births
Living people
Iraqi Shia Muslims